Michael John Daley (born 1 November 1965) is an Australian politician who was the Leader of the Opposition in the Parliament of New South Wales from November 2018 to March 2019. He is currently a member of the New South Wales Legislative Assembly representing Maroubra for the Australian Labor Party since 2005. Daley is aligned with the Labor Right faction.

Biography
Daley is of Irish Catholic background. He was educated at Marcellin College, Randwick, finishing in 1983. He spent 13 years as a Customs officer with the Australian Customs Service during which time he studied law at night. In 1998 having completed his legal studies he was admitted to the Supreme Court of New South Wales as a legal practitioner and began to pursue a career as a lawyer, and worked for a year in a law firm in central Sydney before spending five years as a senior in-house lawyer with NRMA Motoring and Services.

Daley was elected as a councillor to Randwick City Council in 1995 and served as deputy mayor from 2000 to 2004.

Personal life
Daley married Christina Ithier in 2005 whom he met "at a photocopier" at his legal firm in 1997. She had two children from a previous marriage that Daley counts as his own. He and Christina have since had two other children, Olivia (12 in January 2019), and Austin (age 8 in January 2019).

Political career
Daley was elected to represent Maroubra for the Australian Labor Party in 17 Sep 2005, replacing previous Labor member Bob Carr who announced his retirement from politics. Daley served on the backbench until the elevation of Nathan Rees as Premier of New South Wales in September 2008 when Daley became the Minister for Roads on 8 September 2008. Daley held this portfolio until a cabinet reshuffle on 14 September 2009 where he was subsequently appointed Minister for Police and Minister for Finance, the portfolios he held until 4 December 2009.

When Kristina Keneally became Premier in December 2009 he remained as Minister for Police and Minister for Finance until the 2011 state election, where he was one of just 20 Labor MPs elected. Daley was believed to be a potential candidate for the Labor leadership, however, he did not contest it. As a result, John Robertson was elected unopposed as Keneally's replacement, and Daley was appointed as Shadow Treasurer and Shadow Minister for Finance and Services in the Robertson shadow ministry and the subsequent Foley shadow ministry from 11 April 2011 to 10 March 2016 and 28 March 2014, respectively.

In March 2016, he was appointed Shadow Minister for Gaming and Racing, Shadow Minister for Planning and Infrastructure which he held on to until 27 November 2018. He also served as Deputy Leader of the Opposition from 7 March 2016 before being elected as the Leader of the Opposition on 10 November 2018.

Leader of the Opposition
Following Luke Foley's resignation of the role, Daley nominated for the role of New South Wales Labor leader and Leader of the New South Wales Opposition. On 10 November 2018, Daley won the leadership election against Chris Minns 33 votes to 12, and was elected as the Leader of the Labor Party in New South Wales and became the 38th NSW Leader of the Opposition.

On 19 March 2019, a few days prior to the state election, a video from September 2018 surfaced in which Daley made comments about Asian immigration in Sydney. Daley said "Our young children will flee and who are they being replaced with? They are being replaced by young people from typically Asia with PhDs," and "So there's a transformation happening in Sydney now where our kids are moving out and foreigners are moving in and taking their jobs". Daley apologised from his comments, stating "What I was referring to was housing affordability in Sydney ... I could've expressed myself better, no offence was meant." The party was unsuccessful in the election a few days later, and Daley subsequently stood aside as leader and withdrew his candidacy for the subsequent leadership ballot after initially stating that he would contest it. Jodi McKay became the new permanent as party leader and opposition leader in June 2019 after Daley's resignation.

On 30 May 2021, following the resignation of McKay as party leader, Daley announced he would run again for party leadership. On 4 June 2021, he pulled out of the leadership contest, allowing Chris Minns to be elected leader unopposed.

See also
Shadow Ministry of Michael Daley

References

External links
Michael Daley – NSW Labor web page
 

1965 births
Living people
Members of the New South Wales Legislative Assembly
Australian people of Irish descent
Australian public servants
Australian Roman Catholics
Customs officers
Australian Labor Party councillors
Deputy mayors of places in Australia
Australian Labor Party members of the Parliament of New South Wales
21st-century Australian lawyers
21st-century Australian politicians
Leaders of the Opposition in New South Wales
Lawyers from Sydney
Labor Right politicians
Politicians from Sydney